Myka may refer to:

 Myka (river), a river in Perm Krai, Russia
 Myka Relocate, an American metalcore musical ensemble
 Myka 9, an American hip hop musician and producer and member of Freestyle Fellowship
 Myka Bering, fictional character on American television science fiction series Warehouse 13

See also 
 Micah